Bernard Mathieu (born 11 January 1959) is a French Egyptologist who was director of the Institut français d'archéologie orientale from 1999 to 2005.

References

French archaeologists
French Egyptologists
1959 births
Living people
Place of birth missing (living people)
Members of the Institut Français d'Archéologie Orientale